The men's +90 kilograms event at the 2002 Asian Games was held on October 4 and October 6, 2002 at the Busan Citizens' Hall in Busan, South Korea.

Schedule
All times are Korea Standard Time (UTC+09:00)

Results

Preliminary round

Final round 

 Youssef El-Zein of Lebanon originally won the bronze medal, but was disqualified after refusing to take a dope test.

References

Preliminary Round
Final Round

Men's 99 kg